This is a list of continent by gold production in 2018.

Until 2006, South Africa was the world's largest gold producer. In 2007, increasing production from other countries and declining production from South Africa meant that China became the largest producer, although no country has approached the scale of South Africa's period of peak production during the late 1960s and early 1970s. In 1970, South Africa produced 995 tonnes or 32 million ounces of gold, two-thirds of the world's production of 47.5 million ounces.  

Production figures are for primary mine production. In the US, for example, for the year 2011, secondary sources (new and old scrap) exceeded primary production.

See also
 List of gold mines

References

Gold